This list is for notable gardens in Cornwall. It includes Botanical gardens and gardens which are on the: Register of Historic Parks and Gardens of special historic interest in England.

Botanical gardens

Lost Gardens of Heligan
Eden Project
Trebah
Tresco Abbey Gardens

Listed gardens

Antony
Caerhays
Heligan
Lanhydrock
Mount Edgcumbe Country Park
St Michael's Mount
Trebah
Tregrehan
Trelissick
Tresco Abbey (grade I)

Other notable gardens

Bonython
Bosvigo House, Highertown, Truro
Caerhays
Carclew
Chyverton
County Demonstration Garden
Duchy of Cornwall Nursery, Lostwithiel
Glendurgan
Headland, Polruan
Ince
Lanellen
Pencarrow
Penjerrick
Tremeer
Trengwainton
Trerice
Tresillian, Newlyn East
Trevarno
Trewidden
Trewithen

Gardens in Cornwall which are open for charity at appointed times include Boconnoc, Bonython, Bosvigo, Cotehele, Eden Project, Glendurgan, Godolphin, Heligan, Headland at Polruan, Ince Castle, Lanhydrock, Pencarrow, St Michael's Mount, Scorrier, Trebah, Trebartha, Trelissick, Trematon Castle, Trengwainton and Trewan Hall.

See also

:Category:Listed parks and gardens in Cornwall

Footnotes

Taylor, Patrick (1999) Patrick Taylor's Guide to Gardens of Britain & Ireland; 8th ed. London: Dorling Kindersley; The Sunday Telegraph

Further reading
Synge, Patrick M. The Gardens of Britain; Vol. 1: Devon and Cornwall. London: B. T. Batsford in assoc. with Royal Horticultural Society. (1977) 
The Most Amazing Gardens in Britain & Ireland. London: Reader's Digest; Cornwall pp. 10–19

Gardens in Cornwall
Cornwall-related lists